Myrmecaelurinae is a subfamily of Myrmeleontidae, the antlions.

References

External links 

Myrmeleontidae
Insect subfamilies